Paul Winters (born October 3, 1958) is an American college football coach and former player. He was the head football coach at Wayne State University from 2004 until 2022. Winters played college football at the University of Akron as a running back from 1976 to 1979.

Biography

Playing career
Winters played high school football at St. Vincent–St. Mary High School in Akron, Ohio where he became a local prep star. He continued his career at the University of Akron (1976–1979) where he played the running back position. Winters finished his career seventh on the University of Akron's all-time leading rusher list with 2,613 yards. In 1989, Paul Winters was inducted into the University of Akron Sports Hall of Fame.

Coaching career
In 1982, Winters began his collegiate coaching career as a graduate assistant as his alma mater. He worked up the coaching ranks at Akron as an offensive backs coach until 1986 when he accepted the running backs coaching position at the University of Toledo.  He moved on to the University of Wisconsin in 1990.  Winters returned to Akron in 1995 as the offensive coordinator and running backs coach.

Wayne State
Winters accepted his first head coaching position on December 13, 2003, at Wayne State University. In his 10th season as head coach, Winters holds the school's overall record in wins with an overall record of 53 wins to 48 losses. Also, in 2011, Winters coached the school's single-season wins record team to 12 wins and a playoff berth. The 2011 team was the NCAA Division II runner-up after a loss to Pittsburg State in the National Championship game. After the 2011 season, Winters declined a job offer to return to the University of Akron as the head coach, instead choosing to sign an extension at Wayne State through 2016.

Honors
 NCAA Division II Coach of the Year by the American Football Coaches Association (2011)
 2008 Expert Coaches Academy participant
 GLIAC Coach of the Year (2006, 2008, 2019)
In 2004, Paul Winters was regarded as one of the nation's top ten African-American football coaching candidates by the Black Coaches Association. On multiple occasions Winters has been recognized for his achievements as an ethnic minority football coach.

Head coaching record

References

External links
 Wayne State profile

1958 births
Living people
American football running backs
Akron Zips football coaches
Akron Zips football players
Toledo Rockets football coaches
Wayne State Warriors football coaches
Wisconsin Badgers football coaches
Coaches of American football from Ohio
Players of American football from Akron, Ohio
African-American coaches of American football
African-American players of American football
20th-century African-American sportspeople
21st-century African-American sportspeople